Clinton Wesley Battle was a state legislator and public official in North Carolina during and after the Reconstruction era. He represented Edgecombe County in the North Carolina House of Representatives in 1879 and 1881.

Enslaved at birth, Battle was born in Edgecombe County. He also served as a postmaster in Battleboro in Nash County. He served as a trustee of Swift Creek Township and then served two years as a county commissioner before being elected to the North Carolina House of Representatives. He married and had at least one child.

He and W. W. Watson, both "colored", were Republican nominees for North Carolina House seats and served together in 1881.

See also
African-American officeholders during and following the Reconstruction era
List of first African-American U.S. state legislators

References

Year of birth missing (living people)
Living people